Biological response modifiers (BRMs) are substances that modify immune responses. They can be both endogenous (produced naturally within the body) and exogenous (as pharmaceutical drugs), and they can either enhance an immune response or suppress it. Some of these substances arouse the body's response to an infection, and others can keep the response from becoming excessive. Thus they serve as immunomodulators in immunotherapy (therapy that makes use of immune responses), which can be helpful in treating cancer (where targeted therapy often relies on the immune system being used to attack cancer cells) and in treating autoimmune diseases (in which the immune system attacks the self), such as some kinds of arthritis and dermatitis. Most BRMs are biopharmaceuticals (biologics), including monoclonal antibodies, interleukin 2, interferons, and various types of colony-stimulating factors (e.g., CSF, GM-CSF, G-CSF). "Immunotherapy makes use of BRMs to enhance the activity of the immune system to increase the body's natural defense mechanisms against cancer", whereas BRMs for rheumatoid arthritis aim to reduce inflammation.

Some of the effects of BRMs include nausea and vomiting, diarrhea, loss of appetite, fever and chills, muscle aches, weakness, skin rash, an increased tendency to bleed, or swelling. For example, patients with Systemic Lupus Erythematosus (SLE) who are treated with standard of care, including biologic response modifiers, experience a higher risk of mortality and opportunistic infection compared to the general population.

Abciximab
Mechanism of action: A monoclonal antibody that binds to the glycoprotein receptor IIb/IIIa on activated platelets, preventing aggregation.
Clinical use: Acute coronary syndromes, percutaneous transluminal coronary angioplasty.
Toxicity: Bleeding, thrombocytopenia.

Anakinra (Kineret)
Mechanism of action: A recombinant version of the Interleukin 1 receptor antagonist.
Clinical use: Rheumatoid arthritis.
Toxicity: Allergic response & neutropenia.

Etanercept (Enbrel)
Mechanism of action: Recombinant form of human TNF receptor that binds TNF.
Clinical use: Rheumatoid arthritis, psoriasis, ankylosing spondylitis.

Infliximab (Remicade)
Mechanism of action: A monoclonal antibody to TNF, proinflammatory cytokine.
Clinical use: Crohn's disease, rheumatoid arthritis, ankylosing spondylitis.
Toxicity: Respiratory infection, fever, hypotension. Predisposes to infections (reactivation of latent TB).

Rituximab (Rituxan)
Mechanism of action: A monoclonal antibody to CD20 surface immunoglobulin.
Clinical use: Lymphoma and a variety of autoimmune diseases, although it may be ineffective in treating IgA-mediated diseases.

Trastuzumab (Herceptin)
Mechanism of action: A monoclonal antibody against HER2/neu (erb-B2). Helps kill breast cancer cells that overexpress HER-2, possibly through antibody-dependent cytotoxicity.
Clinical use: Metastatic breast cancer.
Toxicity: Cardiotoxicity.

Natural BRMs
Extracts from some medicinal mushrooms are natural biological response modifiers.

See also
 Immunotherapy

References

 Biological Response Modifier
 Deepak A. Rao; Le, Tao; Bhushan, Vikas. First Aid for the USMLE Step 1 2008 (First Aid for the Usmle Step 1). McGraw-Hill Medical. .

Immune system
Immunology